François-Noël Buffet (born 28 August 1963) is a French politician who has served as a Senator for Rhône since 2004. A member of The Republicans (LR), he has also served as a metropolitan councillor of Lyon since 2015.

Buffet, who first entered the municipal council of Oullins in 1990, became Deputy Mayor of Oullins in 1995 under the mayorship of Michel Terrot. He served as Mayor of Oullins from 1997 to 2017.

References

External links
 Page on the Senate website

1963 births
Living people
People from Oullins
Politicians from Auvergne-Rhône-Alpes
20th-century French lawyers
Rally for the Republic politicians
Union for a Popular Movement politicians
The Republicans (France) politicians
Gaullism, a way forward for France
French Senators of the Fifth Republic
Senators of Rhône (department)
French city councillors
Mayors of places in Auvergne-Rhône-Alpes